Gopal Meena (born 16 June 1974) is a politician of Rajasthan. He is a member of the Indian National Congress party.

Gopal Meena was Member of the Legislative Assembly in the Rajasthan Legislative Assembly from the Jamwa Ramgarh constituency in 13th Legislative Assembly of Rajasthan.

He is also member of the legislative assembly from Jamwa Ramgarh constituency in 15th legislative assembly Rajasthan.

References

External links
 Assembly member page

Rajasthani politicians
People from Jaipur district
Living people
Rajasthan MLAs 2013–2018
1976 births
Rajasthan MLAs 2018–2023
Indian National Congress politicians from Rajasthan